The Essential Yanni is a compilation album by keyboardist and composer Yanni, released on the Legacy label in 2010. The album peaked at #6 on Billboard's "Top New Age Albums" chart in 2010.

Track listing
Disc 1

Disc 2

Production
A&R: Didier Deutsch
Mastering Engineer: Maria Triana
Product Development: David Foil & Jennifer Liebeskind
Marketing: Leslie Collman-Smith & Scott Farthing
Art Direction & Design: Roxanne Slimax
Photography: Lynn Goldsmith
Packaging Manager: Tammy Van Aken

(Production as described in CD liner notes.)

References

External links
Official Website

Yanni albums
2010 greatest hits albums
Legacy Recordings compilation albums